
Gmina Inowrocław is a rural gmina (administrative district) in Inowrocław County, Kuyavian-Pomeranian Voivodeship, in north-central Poland. Its seat is the town of Inowrocław, although the town is not part of the territory of the gmina.

Villages
Gmina Inowrocław contains the villages and settlements of Balczewo, Balin, Batkowo, Borkowo, Cieślin, Czyste, Dulsk, Dziennice, Gnojno, Góra, Jacewo, Jaksice, Jaksiczki, Jaronty, Karczyn-Wieś, Kłopot, Komaszyce, Kruśliwiec, Krusza Duchowna, Krusza Podlotowa, Krusza Zamkowa, Łąkocin, Latkowo, Łojewo, Marcinkowo, Marulewy, Miechowice, Mimowola, Olszewice, Oporówek, Orłowo, Ostrowo Krzyckie, Piotrkowice, Pławin, Pławinek, Popowice, Radłówek, Sikorowo, Sławęcin, Sławęcinek, Słońsko, Sójkowo, Stefanowo, Strzemkowo, Trzaski, Tupadły, Turlejewo, Turzany, Witowy and Żalinowo.

Neighbouring gminas
Gmina Inowrocław is bordered by the town of Inowrocław and by the gminas of Dąbrowa Biskupia, Gniewkowo, Janikowo, Kruszwica, Pakość, Rojewo, Strzelno and Złotniki Kujawskie.

References
Polish official population figures 2006

Inowroclaw
Inowrocław County